The Highstreetmail (HSM) is Ghanaian daily Online newspaper, founded and continuously published in Accra since 2012. Its website is Ghana's most popular online news site, receiving more than 250,000 unique visitors per month.

References 

Newspapers published in Ghana
Mass media in Accra
2012 establishments in Ghana